Sónia Chan Hoi Fan (born December 1964), was the Secretary for Administration and Justice, second most senior government official in Macau.

Chan was born in Guangzhou, Guangdong province in December 1964. She received a bachelor's degree in law from Sun Yat-sen University. In 2000, she attended Renmin University of China in Beijing and earned a master's degree in Criminal Law. Chan was the chairperson of the Female Civil Servants Association from 1999 to 2010 and the director of the Alumni Association of Macao Academy Education Fund Society since 1992.

She has been with the Macau civil service since 1994 having served in various positions:

 Head of the Division of Criminal Record under the Identification Services Bureau (DSI), 1994-1998
 Deputy Director of the Identification Services Bureau (DSI), 1998-2010
  Coordinator of the Office for Personal Data Protection, 2007-2014

References

External links 

 Sonia Chan

1964 births
Living people
Macanese people
Government ministers of Macau
Macau women in politics
Politicians from Guangzhou
Renmin University of China alumni
Sun Yat-sen University alumni
Female justice ministers